The football tournament at the 1971 Southeast Asian Peninsular Games was held from 12 December to 18 December 1971 in Kuala Lumpur, Malaysia.

Teams

Tournament

Group stage

Group A

Group B

Knockout stage

Semi-finals

Bronze medal match

Gold medal match

Winners

Medal winners

References 
Southeast Asian Peninsular Games 1971 at RSSSF
SEAP Games 1971 at AFF official website

1971 Southeast Asian Peninsular Games
Southeast
Football at the Southeast Asian Games
1971
1971 in Malaysian sport